Borcea may refer to:

Borcea, a commune in Călărași County, Romania
Ioan Borcea (1879–1936), Romanian zoologist
Ion Borcea Technical College, high school in Buhuși, Romania
Julius Borcea (1968–2009), Romanian Swedish mathematician
Liliana Borcea, Romanian American applied mathematician

Romanian-language surnames